Maximiliano Alberto Lovera (born 9 March 1999) is an Argentine professional footballer who plays as a winger for Super League Greece club Ionikos, on loan from Olympiacos.

Club career

Rosario Central
Lovera joined the Rosario Central senior squad for the 2016 Argentine Primera División season, making his professional debut on 2 May 2016 during a loss to Gimnasia y Esgrima. He made one further appearance during 2016, versus Quilmes on 15 May. In his first match of 2016–17, in December, Lovera netted the first goal of his career in a defeat against Lanús. He ended that season with two goals in sixteen fixtures.

Olympiacos
On 31 August 2019, after three goals in sixty-nine matches, Lovera left Rosario Central for Super League Greece side Olympiacos; for a reported initial fee of €3.3 million. His first appearance came against Lamia on 28 September. He netted two goals in a round of sixteen victory over Kalamata on 15 January 2020 in the Greek Cup; the final for which, in August, was postponed due to Lovera's positive COVID-19 test. After featuring in a cup match against Panetolikos on 20 January 2021, Lovera departed on loan.

Racing Club loan
In early February 2021, Racing Club completed the loan signing of Lovera; until the succeeding December.

AC Omonia loan
On 31 January 2022, in the last day of winter transfer window, Omonia completed the loan signing of Lovera, until the summer of 2022.

International career
In July 2017, Lovera was selected for Argentina U20 training. He was again chosen by the U20s in the following May, to train with the senior squad at the 2018 FIFA World Cup in Russia. In October 2018, Lovera played and scored for the U20s in a friendly with Ecuador.

Personal life
In August 2020, it was announced that Lovera had tested positive for COVID-19; amid the pandemic. This caused the 2019–20 Greek Cup final, which Olympiacos later won, to be postponed.

Career statistics
.

Honours
Rosario Central
Copa Argentina: 2017–18

Olympiacos
Super League Greece: 2019–20
Greek Cup: 2019–20

 Omonia
Cypriot Cup: 2021–22

References

External links

1999 births
Living people
People from Formosa Province
Argentine footballers
Argentina youth international footballers
Argentina under-20 international footballers
Association football midfielders
Argentine expatriate footballers
Expatriate footballers in Greece
Expatriate footballers in Cyprus
Argentine expatriate sportspeople in Greece
Argentine expatriate sportspeople in Cyprus
Argentine Primera División players
Super League Greece players
Cypriot First Division players
Rosario Central footballers
Olympiacos F.C. players
Racing Club de Avellaneda footballers
AC Omonia players
Ionikos F.C. players